"Stay Real" is a song by American hip hop artist Erick Sermon. The song was released as the second and final single for Sermon's debut album No Pressure on September 7, 1993.

The song peaked at number ninety-two on the Billboard Hot 100 chart.

Track listing
12", Vinyl
"Stay Real" (LP Version) - 3:59
"Stay Real" (Instrumental) - 3:59
"Safe Sex" (LP Version) - 3:49
"Safe Sex" (Instrumental) - 3:49
"Rock Da House" - 2:34

Chart performance

Personnel
Information taken from Discogs.
engineering – George "Catfish" Pappas, Darren Prindle
mastering – Howie Weinberg
mixing – George "Catfish" Pappas
production – Erick Sermon
vocals – Debra Killings

Notes

External links

1993 singles
Erick Sermon songs
Song recordings produced by Erick Sermon
1993 songs
Songs written by Larry Troutman
Songs written by Roger Troutman
Songs written by Erick Sermon